Jealous Husbands is a 1923 American silent drama film directed by Maurice Tourneur and starring Earle Williams, Jane Novak, and Ben Alexander.

Plot
As described in a film magazine review, returning from Europe, Ramón Martinez overhears a conversation which causes him to doubt the fidelity of Alice, his wife. On reaching home, who is away. He finds a note among her belongings which increases his suspicions. A burglar appears and is made the instrument of Ramón's revenge, being hired to abduct Ramón's little son. The son grows up in the company of Romani people. Years later, he is found by his real parents and a packet of letters turns up which establishes Alice's innocence, leading to happiness for all.

Cast

Preservation
With no prints of Jealous Husbands located in any film archives, it is a lost film.

References

Bibliography
 Waldman, Harry. Maurice Tourneur: The Life and Films. McFarland & Co., 2001.

External links

1923 films
1923 drama films
Silent American drama films
Films directed by Maurice Tourneur
American silent feature films
1920s English-language films
First National Pictures films
American black-and-white films
Lost American films
1923 lost films
Lost drama films
1920s American films